Frank Jackson Okell (3 February 1887 – 7 October 1950.) was the inaugural Bishop of Stockport whose 11-month tenure from November 1949, until October 1950, was one of the shortest in the Anglican Communion.

He was educated at Rugby School and Trinity College, Oxford. Ordained in 1914 he was  a curate at Bolsterstone before wartime service as a temporary chaplain. Following the Armistice he was a Minor Canon at Sheffield Cathedral then Rector of Bangor Monachorum. A sideways move to Eccleston, Cheshire led to promotion to be Rural Dean of Malpas and finally, before his appointment to the episcopate, Archdeacon of Macclesfield. He was ordained and consecrated a bishop on All Saints' Day (1 November) at York Minster.

References

1887 births
People educated at Rugby School
Alumni of Trinity College, Oxford
Bishops of Stockport
Archdeacons of Macclesfield
1950 deaths
World War I chaplains
Royal Army Chaplains' Department officers
20th-century Church of England bishops